Sarvani Sangeetha Sabha is a musical festival held in Chennai, Tamil Nadu. It has been promoting classical music and encouraging young talents since 1986.

References

Music festivals established in 1986

Music festivals in India
Classical music festivals in India
Culture of Chennai
Events in Chennai